María Concepción Alós Domingo (22 May 1926 – 1 August 2011), better known as Concha Alós, was a Spanish writer. She was a recipient of the Premio Planeta de Novela.

Biography
Born in Valencia, Alós lived the better part of her life in Barcelona. In 1962 she made her literary debut with the novel Los Enanos, and followed it up with Los cien pájaros in 1963. The success she attained with her early works was consolidated in 1964 when she received the 13th Premio Planeta de Novela literary prize for her novel Las hogueras. Her last published novel was El asesino de los sueños in 1986.

Part of her childhood was spent in Castellón de la Plana, currently in the Valencian Community, within a Republican working-class family. Due to bombardments by Nationalist forces during the Civil War, the family moved to Lorca, Murcia. A similar flight and return is the central theme of her novel El caballo rojo.

She was the wife and disseminator of the work of the writer, journalist, and literary critic Baltasar Porcel, and translated part of his work from Catalan to Castilian Spanish. They met while Porcel was working as a typesetter at the Francoist Majorcan newspaper Baleares, owned by Alós's first husband. Year later, both writers got divorced.

Her work is framed within realism and social testimony. It addresses in direct language issues which were common in Spanish literature of the time, such as sex, homosexuality, and prostitution. Because of this, Alós had problems with Francoist censorship, but nevertheless several of her works were bestsellers in the 1960s and '70s.

Work
 Cuando la luna cambia de color (1958) – novel
 Los enanos (1962) – novel
 Los cien pájaros (1963) – novel
 Las hogueras (1964) – novel (winner of the 13th Premio Planeta)
 El caballo rojo (1966) – novel
 La madama (1969) – novel
 Rey de Gatos. Narraciones antropófagas. (1972) – short stories
 Os habla Electra (1975) – novel
 Argeo ha muerto, supongo (1982) – novel
 El asesino de los sueños (1986) – novel

References

Further reading
 

1926 births
2011 deaths
20th-century Spanish novelists
Catalan–Spanish translators
People from Valencia
Spanish feminists
Spanish women novelists
Writers from the Valencian Community
20th-century Spanish women writers
20th-century Spanish writers
Pseudonymous women writers
20th-century translators
20th-century pseudonymous writers